Dot Hicks Field is a softball park in Huntington, West Virginia where it is home to Marshall University's softball team.

Background 
Built in 2008, the $2.5 million facility features a clubhouse, grandstands, pressbox and concession building, warmup areas, and the playing field. The field is named after Dorothy "Dot" Hicks, who was a donor and former coach of Marshall's volleyball, badminton, women's tennis and women's golf teams. An inaugural double-header took place on March 15, 2008. The Thundering Herd lost to Houston in both games, 17–2 and 10–2 respectively.

References

Sports venues in West Virginia
Marshall Thundering Herd softball
Buildings and structures in Huntington, West Virginia
College softball venues in the United States
Sports venues completed in 2008
2008 establishments in West Virginia